1/7 most commonly refers to 1/7 (number), a fraction (one seventh)

1/7 may also refer to:
 January 7 (month-day date notation)
 1 July (day-month date notation)
 1st Battalion 7th Marines
7th Battalion (1st British Columbia), CEF
 The margin at Brazil v Germany (2014 FIFA World Cup)
 1 shilling and 7 pence in UK predecimal currency

See also
 7/1 (disambiguation)
 Angiotensin (1-7)
 Schweizer SGU 1-7